Kim Min-kyu (born 7 July 2000) is a South Korean professional footballer who plays as a defender for Hong Kong Premier League club Rangers.

Career statistics

Club

Notes

References

2000 births
Living people
Jeonju University alumni
South Korean footballers
Association football defenders
Hong Kong First Division League players
Hong Kong Premier League players
Hoi King SA players
Hong Kong Rangers FC players
South Korean expatriate footballers
South Korean expatriate sportspeople in Hong Kong
Expatriate footballers in Hong Kong